Adela Mary Younghusband (née Roche, 3 April 1878 – 3 April 1969), generally known as Adele Younghusband, was a New Zealand painter and photographer.

Biography
Adela Mary Roche was born in Te Awamutu on 3 April 1878. She married Frank Younghusband in Christchurch on 1 August 1905, and they went on to have three children, before separating in about 1917.

After working as a photographic retoucher in Hamilton, Younghusband became a member of the Auckland Society of Arts in 1909. In 1919, Younghusband began running a photographic studio in Whangarei, and establishing herself as a successful portrait photographer. Together with George Woolley, Younghusband helped establish the Whangarei Art and Literary Society, and acted as its secretary. In August 1934, with Ida Carey, Younghusband convened the inaugural meeting of the Waikato Society of Arts in Hamilton. She became its secretary and represented it on the Association of New Zealand Art Societies. In the late 1930s she developed an interest in abstract surrealism and studied with George Bell in Melbourne. In 1964, Younghusband was made a life member of the Waikato Society of Arts.

Exhibitions

Selected solo exhibitions
Younghusband was exhibited at
 An Exhibition of Paintings and Lino-Cuts by Adele Younghusband, Lodestar Galleries Sydney, 1937
 Solo Exhibition Auckland Society of Arts, 1941
 Solo Exhibition Waikato Society of Arts, 1945
 Solo Exhibition Auckland Society of Arts, 1957
 John Leech Gallery Auckland, 1991
 Adele Younghusband In Context, Whangarei Art Museum, 1998

Selected group exhibitions
 New Zealand Academy of Fine Arts Annual Exhibition, 1932
 New Zealand Society of Artists First General Exhibition, 1933
 Museum of New Zealand Te Papa Tongarewa, Toi Te Papa | Art Of The Nation, 2005

References

Further reading
 Hipwell, A. C. 'Adele Younghusband: a New Zealand surrealist'. Art in New Zealand 14, No 2 (Dec. 1941)

1878 births
1969 deaths
New Zealand photographers
New Zealand women photographers
People from Te Awamutu
Portrait photographers
20th-century New Zealand painters
20th-century New Zealand women artists
20th-century women photographers